Belle de Gast (born 4 February 1991) is a Dutch professional racing cyclist, who currently rides for UCI Women's Continental Team .

References

External links
 

1991 births
Living people
Dutch female cyclists
Place of birth missing (living people)
Sportspeople from Utrecht (city)
Cyclists from Utrecht (province)